

Events

January

 January 1 - The United Kingdom, the Republic of Ireland and Denmark enter the European Economic Community, which later becomes the European Union.
 January 15 – Vietnam War: Citing progress in peace negotiations, U.S. President Richard Nixon announces the suspension of offensive action in North Vietnam.
 January 17 – Ferdinand Marcos becomes President for Life of the Philippines.
 January 20 – Richard Nixon is sworn in for a second term as President of the United States. Nixon is the only person to have been sworn in twice as President (1969, 1973) and Vice President of the United States (1953, 1957).
 January 22
 George Foreman defeats Joe Frazier to win the heavyweight world boxing championship.
 A Royal Jordanian Boeing 707 flight from Jeddah crashes in Kano, Nigeria; 176 people are killed.
 January 27 – U.S. involvement in the Vietnam War ends with the signing of the Paris Peace Accords.

February

 February 8 – A military insurrection in Uruguay poses an institutional challenge to President Juan María Bordaberry.
 February 21 – Libyan Arab Airlines Flight 114 (Boeing 727) is shot down by Israeli fighter aircraft over the Sinai Desert, after the passenger plane is suspected of being an enemy military plane. Only 5 (1 crew member and 4 passengers) of 113 survive.
 February 28 – The Republic of Ireland general election is held. Liam Cosgrave becomes the new Taoiseach.

March

 March 7 – Comet Kohoutek is discovered.
 March 8 – The Troubles: A referendum is held in Northern Ireland over whether to reunite with the Republic of Ireland or to stay a part of the UK. The result was 98% remain. The Provisional Irish Republican Army responds to the referendum by planting four car bombs in London on the same day, two of which went off, causing one death and injuring over 200 people.
 March 10 – Sir Richard Sharples, Governor of Bermuda, is assassinated outside Government House, along with his aide-de-camp.
 March 20 – A British government White Paper on Northern Ireland proposes the re-establishment of an Assembly elected by proportional representation, with a possible All-Ireland council.
 March 21 – The Lofthouse Colliery disaster occurs in Great Britain. Seven miners are trapped underground; none survive.
 March 27 – At the 45th Academy Awards, The Godfather wins best picture.

April

 April 1 
India launches the wildlife conservation program Project Tiger.  
Value Added Tax (VAT) is introduced in the United Kingdom.
 April 3 – The first handheld mobile phone call is made by Martin Cooper of Motorola in New York City.
 April 5 
 Fahri Korutürk becomes the sixth president of Turkey.
 Pioneer 11 is launched on a mission to study the Solar System.
 April 6 – Ron Blomberg of the New York Yankees becomes the first designated hitter in Major League Baseball.
 April 7 – Tu te reconnaîtras by Anne-Marie David (music by Claude Morgan, text by Vline Buggy) wins the Eurovision Song Contest 1973 for Luxembourg. 
 April 10 – Operation Spring of Youth: Israeli commandos raid Beirut, assassinating 3 leaders of the Palestinian Resistance Movement. The Lebanese army's inaction brings the immediate resignation of Prime Minister Saeb Salam, a Sunni Muslim.
 April 10 – The Islamic Republic of Pakistan introduced its new constitution, its supreme law. 
 April 15 – Naim Talu, a former civil servant, forms the new government of Turkey (36th government).
 April 17 – The German counter-terrorist force GSG 9 is officially formed in response to the Munich massacre.

May

 May 5 – Shambu Tamang becomes the youngest person to climb to the summit of Mount Everest. 
 May 10 – The Polisario Front, a Sahrawi movement dedicated to the independence of Spanish Sahara, is formed.
 May 11 – The Data Act (Sw. Datalagen) − the world's first national data protection law − is enacted in Sweden.
 May 14 – Skylab, the United States' first space station, is launched.
 May 18 – Second Cod War: Joseph Godber, British Minister of Agriculture, Fisheries and Food, announces that Royal Navy frigates will protect British trawlers fishing in the disputed  limit around Iceland.
 May 25
 Skylab 2 (Pete Conrad, Paul Weitz, Joseph Kerwin) is launched on a mission to repair damage to the recently launched Skylab space station.
 Héctor José Cámpora becomes democratic president of the Argentine Republic ending the 1966 to 1973 Revolución Argentina military dictatorship.
 May 30 – Gordon Johncock wins the Indianapolis 500 in the Patrick Racing Special Eagle-Offenhauser, after only 133 laps, due to rain. (The race was begun May 28 but called due to rain.)

June

 June 1 – The Greek military junta abolishes the monarchy and proclaims a republic.
 June 3 – A Tupolev Tu-144 crashes at the Paris air show; 15 are killed.
 June 10 – Henri Pescarolo and co-driver Gérard Larrousse (both France) win the 24 Hours of Le Mans in the Equipe Matra MS670B.
 June 20 – The Ezeiza massacre occurs in Buenos Aires, Argentina. Snipers shoot at left-wing Peronists, killing at least 13 and injuring more than 300.
 June 24 
 Leonid Brezhnev addresses the American people on television, the first Soviet leader to do so.
 UpStairs Lounge arson attack, an as-yet unsolved attack on a gay bar in New Orleans, Louisiana, in which 32 patrons are killed.
 June 25 – Erskine Hamilton Childers is elected the 4th President of Ireland.
 June 26 – At Plesetsk Cosmodrome, nine people are killed in the explosion of a Cosmos 3-M rocket.
 June 27 – Coup d'état in Uruguay: pressed by the military, President Juan María Bordaberry dissolves Parliament; a 12-year-long civic-military dictatorship begins.
 June 28 – Elections are held for the Northern Ireland Assembly, which will lead to power-sharing between unionists and nationalists in Northern Ireland for the first time.
 June 30 – A very long total solar eclipse occurs. During the entire second millennium, only seven total solar eclipses exceeded seven minutes of totality.

July

 July 3 – Conference on Security and Cooperation in Europe (CSCE).
 July 5 – The catastrophic BLEVE (Boiling Liquid Expanding Vapor Explosion) occurs in Kingman, Arizona, United States, following a fire that broke out as propane was being transferred from a railroad car to a storage tank, killing 11 firefighters. This explosion becomes a classic incident, studied in fire department training programs worldwide.
 July 10 – The Bahamas gains full independence within the Commonwealth of Nations.
 July 11 – Varig Flight 820 crashes near Orly, France; 123 people are killed.
 July 16 – Watergate scandal: Former White House aide Alexander Butterfield informs the United States Senate Watergate Committee that President Richard Nixon had secretly recorded potentially incriminating conversations.
 July 17 – King Mohammed Zahir Shah of Afghanistan is deposed by his cousin Mohammed Daoud Khan while in Italy undergoing eye surgery.
 July 20 – France resumes nuclear bomb tests in Mururoa Atoll, over the protests of Australia and New Zealand.
 July 21 – Lillehammer affair: Agents of Mossad, the Israeli secret intelligence agency, shoot and kill a Moroccan waiter in Lillehammer, Norway, mistakenly believing him to be a senior member of the Palestinian Black September Organization.
 July 23 – The Avianca Building in Bogotá, Colombia, suffers a serious fire, in which four people are killed.
 July 25 – The Soviet Mars 5 space probe is launched.
 July 28 – Skylab 3 (Owen Garriott, Jack Lousma, Alan Bean) is launched, to conduct various medical and scientific experiments aboard Skylab.
 July 31 – A Delta Air Lines DC-9 aircraft flying as Delta Air Lines Flight 173 lands short of Logan Airport runway at Boston, United States, in poor visibility, striking a sea wall about 165 feet (50 m) to the right of the runway centerline and about 3000 feet (914 m) short. All 6 crew members and 83 passengers are killed; one of the passengers died several months after the accident.

August

 August 1 – Caribbean Community and Common Market (CARICOM) is inaugurated.
 August 2 – A flash fire kills 51 at the Summerland amusement centre at Douglas, Isle of Man.
 August 5
 Black September members open fire at the Athens airport; 3 people are killed, 55 injured.
 Mars 6, also known as 3MP No.50P, is launched by the Soviet Union to explore Mars. 
 August 8 – South Korean politician Kim Dae-jung is kidnapped in Tokyo by the KCIA.
 August 15 – The U.S. bombing of Cambodia ends, officially halting 12 years of combat activity in Southeast Asia according to the Case–Church Amendment-an act that prohibits military operations in Laos, Cambodia, and North and South Vietnam as a follow up of the Paris Peace Accords. 
 August 23 – The Norrmalmstorg robbery occurs, famous for the origin of the term Stockholm syndrome.
 August 25 – Disappearance of Joanne Ratcliffe and Kirste Gordon: Two Australian girls go missing whilst attending an Australian rules football match at the Adelaide Oval, never to be seen again.

September

 September 9 – Scottish racing driver Jackie Stewart becomes World Drivers' Champion when his Tyrrell 003-Cosworth finishes fourth in the 1973 Italian Grand Prix at Monza.
 September 11 – Chile's democratically elected government is overthrown in a violent military coup after serious political instability. President Salvador Allende allegedly commits suicide during the coup in the presidential palace, and General Augusto Pinochet heads a US-backed military junta that governs Chile for the next 17 years.
 September 15 – Carl XVI Gustaf, becomes King of Sweden following the death of his grandfather, King Gustaf VI Adolf.
 September 18 – The two German Republics, the Federal Republic of Germany (West Germany) and the German Democratic Republic (East Germany), are admitted to the United Nations.
 September 27 
 Soviet space program: Soyuz 12 (Vasily Lazarev, Oleg Makarov), the first Soviet manned flight since the Soyuz 11 tragedy in 1971, is launched.
 Luís Cabral declares the independence of the Republic of Guinea-Bissau from the Estado Novo regime in Portugal. It is later granted in September 1974.

October

 October 6 
Yom Kippur War begins: The fourth and largest Arab–Israeli conflict begins, as Egyptian and Syrian forces attack Israeli forces in the Sinai Peninsula and Golan Heights on Yom Kippur.
 October 14 – Thai popular uprising Students revolt in Bangkok – In the Thammasat student uprising over 100,000 people protest in Thailand against the Thanom military government, 77 are killed and 857 are injured by soldiers.
 October 15 – Typhoon Ruth crosses Luzon, Philippines, killing 27 people and causing $5 million in damage.
 October 17 – An OPEC oil embargo against several countries supporting Israel triggers the 1973 energy crisis.
 October 20
 The Saturday Night Massacre: U.S. President Richard Nixon orders Attorney General Elliot Richardson to dismiss Watergate Special Prosecutor Archibald Cox. Richardson refuses and resigns, along with Deputy Attorney General William Ruckelshaus. Solicitor General Robert Bork, third in line at the Department of Justice, then fires Cox. The event prompts calls for Nixon's impeachment.
 The Sydney Opera House in Australia is opened by Queen Elizabeth II after 14 years of construction work.

 October 25 – The Yom Kippur War ends.
 October 26 – The United Nations recognizes the independence of Guinea-Bissau.
 October 30 – The Bosphorus Bridge in Istanbul, Turkey, is completed, connecting the continents of Europe and Asia over the Bosphorus Strait for the first time in history.

November

 November 3
 Pan Am cargo flight 160, a Boeing 707-321C, crashes at Logan International Airport, Boston, killing three people.
 Mariner program: NASA launches Mariner 10 toward Mercury (on March 29, 1974, it becomes the first space probe to reach that planet).
 November 7 – The Congress of the United States overrides President Richard Nixon's veto of the War Powers Resolution, which limits presidential power to wage war without congressional approval.
 November 8 – Millennium '73, a festival hosted by Guru Maharaj Ji at the Astrodome, is called by supporters the "most significant event in human history".
 November 11 – Egypt and Israel sign a United States-sponsored cease-fire accord.
 November 16
 Skylab program: NASA launches Skylab 4 (Gerald Carr, William Pogue, Edward Gibson) from Cape Canaveral, Florida, on an 84-day mission.
 U.S. President Richard Nixon signs the Trans-Alaska Pipeline Authorization Act into law, authorizing the construction of the Alaska Pipeline.
 November 17 – The Athens Polytechnic uprising occurs against the military regime in Athens, Greece.
 November 25 – Greek dictator Georgios Papadopoulos is ousted in a military coup led by Brigadier General Dimitrios Ioannidis. 
 November 27 – The United States Senate votes 92–3 to confirm Gerald Ford as Vice President of the United States.
 November 29 – 104 people are killed in a Taiyo department store fire in Kumamoto, Kyūshū, Japan.
 November – Queen Sisowath Kossamak of Cambodia is released from house arrest to Beijing.

December

 December – Chile breaks diplomatic contacts with Sweden.
 December 1 – Papua New Guinea gains self-government from Australia.
 December 3 – Pioneer program: Pioneer 10 sends back the first close-up images of Jupiter.
 December 6 – The United States House of Representatives votes 387–35 to confirm Gerald Ford as Vice President of the United States; he is sworn in the same day.
 December 14 – Rhodesia executes two Blacks at Salisbury Central Prison for murder 
 December 18
 Soviet space program: Soyuz 13 (Pyotr Klimuk, Valentin Lebedev) is launched.
 The Islamic Development Bank is created as a specialized agency of the Organisation of the Islamic Conference (OIC) (effective August 12, 1974).
 December 20 – Spanish prime minister Luis Carrero Blanco is assassinated in Madrid by the separatist organization ETA.
 December 28 – The Endangered Species Act is passed in the United States.
 December 30 – Terrorist Carlos fails in his attempt to assassinate British businessman Joseph Sieff.

Date unknown
 A large Song dynasty trade ship of c. 1277 A.D. is dredged up from the waters near the southern coast of China with 12 compartments in its hull. It confirms the descriptions of bulkheaded hull compartments for junks in Zhu Yu's Pingzhou Table Talks of 1119.

Births

January

 January 1 – Shelda Bede, Brazilian beach volleyball player
 January 9 – Sean Paul, Jamaican singer
 January 11 – Rahul Dravid, Indian cricket player and coach.
 January 12 – Hande Yener, Turkish singer
 January 13 – Nikolai Khabibulin, Russian ice hockey player
 January 14 – Giancarlo Fisichella, Italian racing driver
 January 15
 Essam El Hadary, Egyptian goalkeeper
 Tomáš Galásek, Czech football player
 January 17 – Cuauhtémoc Blanco, Mexican footballer and politician, Governor of Morelos 2018-2024
 January 19
 Ann Kristin Aarønes, Norwegian footballer
 Wang Junxia, Chinese long-distance runner
 Yevgeny Sadovyi, Russian swimmer
 January 20 – Queen Mathilde of Belgium
 January 22 – Rogério Ceni, Brazilian football player and coach
 January 26 – Brendan Rodgers, Northern Irish football manager
 January 27 – Shadmehr Aghili, Iranian pop singer, musician and composer
 January 29 – Louise Hindsgavl, Danish artist
 January 30 – Jalen Rose, American basketball player
 January 31 – Portia de Rossi, Australian-American actress

February

 February 1
 Yuri Landman, Dutch artist and musician
 Óscar Pérez Rojas, Mexican football goalkeeper
 February 2 – Aleksander Tammert, Estonian discus thrower
 February 4 – Oscar De La Hoya, American boxer
 February 5
 Trijntje Oosterhuis, Dutch pop singer
 Deng Yaping, Chinese table tennis player
 February 7 – Juwan Howard, American basketball player
 February 9 – Svetlana Boginskaya, Soviet gymnast
 February 10 – Gunn-Rita Dahle, Norwegian mountain biker
 February 11
 Jeon Do-yeon, South Korean actress
 Mishal Husain, British news presenter 
 Varg Vikernes, Norwegian rock musician
 February 12 – Tara Strong, Canadian actress and voice actress
 February 15
 Anna Dogonadze, German trampoline gymnast
 Amy Van Dyken, American swimmer
 Sarah Wynter, Australian actress
 February 16 – Cathy Freeman, Australian athlete 
 February 18 – Claude Makélélé, French footballer
 February 22 – Shota Arveladze, Georgian football player and coach
 February 24
 Alexei Kovalev, Russian ice hockey player
 Yordan Yovchev, Bulgarian gymnast
 February 25 – Julio Iglesias Jr., Spanish singer
 February 26
 ATB, German DJ and music producer
 Ole Gunnar Solskjær, Norwegian footballer
 Jenny Thompson, American swimmer
 February 27 
 Peter Andre, English singer and television personality
 Li Bingbing, Chinese actress
 February 28 – Eric Lindros, Canadian hockey player

March

 March 1
 Jack Davenport, English actor
 Chris Webber, American basketball player
 March 2 – Vidya Malvade, Indian actress
 March 3 – Dejan Bodiroga, Serbian basketball player
 March 4 – Penny Mordaunt, British politician
 March 9 – Matteo Salvini, Italian politician
 March 10 – Eva Herzigová, Czech model and actress
 March 13
 Edgar Davids, Dutch footballer
 David Draiman songwriter and lead singer for the band Disturbed
 Ólafur Darri Ólafsson, Icelandic actor
 March 15 – Lee Jung-jae, South Korean actor and model
 March 17 – Caroline Corr, Irish musician (The Corrs)
 March 19 – Magnus Hedman, Swedish footballer
 March 23
 Jerzy Dudek, Polish footballer
 Jason Kidd, American basketball player
 March 24
 Jacek Bąk, Polish footballer
 Jim Parsons, American actor and comedian
 March 25 – Anders Fridén, Swedish musician
 March 26 – Larry Page, American entrepreneur, founder and CEO of Google (2011-2015)
 March 28 – Umaga, Samoan-American professional wrestler (d. 2009)
 March 29 – Marc Overmars, Dutch footballer
 March 30 – Jan Koller, Czech footballer

April

 April 1
 Stephen Fleming, New Zealand cricket captain
 Rachel Maddow, American political commentator
 April 2 – Roselyn Sánchez, Puerto Rican-American actress
 April 3 – Jamie Bamber, English actor
 April 4
 David Blaine, American magician
 Loris Capirossi, Italian motorcycle racer
 April 5
 Élodie Bouchez, French actress 
 Pharrell Williams, American musician and producer 
 April 6 – Rie Miyazawa, Japanese actress and singer
 April 8 – Emma Caulfield, American actress
 April 10 – Roberto Carlos, Brazilian footballer
 April 11 – Jennifer Esposito, American actress
 April 12
 Christina Moore, American actress
 Amr Waked, Egyptian film, television and stage actor
 April 13 – Sergey Shnurov, Russian singer
 April 14 
 Roberto Ayala, Argentine footballer
 Adrien Brody, American actor
 April 16 – Akon, Senegalese American rapper, R&B singer-songwriter and record producer
 April 18 – Haile Gebrselassie, Ethiopian long-distance runner
 April 19 – George Gregan, Australian rugby union footballer
 April 21 – Katsuyuki Konishi, Japanese voice actor
 April 23 – Cem Yılmaz, Turkish comedian and actor
 April 24
 Sachin Tendulkar, Indian cricketer
 Lee Westwood, English golfer
 April 27 – Sharlee D'Angelo, Swedish guitarist
 April 28
 Jorge Garcia, American actor and comedian
 Pauleta, Portuguese footballer
 Elisabeth Röhm, German-American actress
 April 29 – David Belle, French actor and stunt performer

May

 May 1
 Paul Burke, Irish rugby player
 Diana Hayden, Miss World and Indian actress
 Oliver Neuville, German footballer
 May 2 – Florian Henckel von Donnersmarck, German director
 May 3 – Michael Reiziger, Dutch footballer
 May 4 – Guillermo Barros Schelotto, Argentine footballer
 May 5 – Johan Hedberg, Swedish retired hockey goaltender also known as "Moose"
 May 7 – Paolo Savoldelli, Italian professional road racing cyclist
 May 8 – Hiromu Arakawa, Japanese manga artist
 May 9 – Tegla Loroupe, Kenyan long-distance runner
 May 10
 Keylla Hernandéz, Puerto Rican television reporter (d. 2018)
 Rüştü Reçber, Turkish football goalkeeper
 May 12 – Robert Tinkler, Canadian voice actor
 May 14
 Natalie Appleton, Canadian singer (All Saints)
 Shanice, African-American singer
 May 16
 Jason Acuña, American skateboarder and actor
 Tori Spelling, American actress
 May 17
 Sasha Alexander, American actress
 Josh Homme, American musician
 May 20 – Elsa Lunghini, French actress and singer
 May 21 – Noel Fielding, British comedian
 May 24
 Bartolo Colón, Dominican baseball player
 Ruslana, Ukrainian pop star, activist, Eurovision Song Contest 2004 winner
 Vladimír Šmicer, Czech footballer
 May 25
 Jean-Pierre Canlis, American glass artist
 Demetri Martin, American actor and comedian
 May 27 – Jack McBrayer, American actor and comedian
 May 31 – Dominique van Roost, Belgian tennis player

June

 

 June 1
 Fred Deburghgraeve, Belgian swimmer
 Adam Garcia, Australian actor and singer
 Heidi Klum, German model
 Derek Lowe, American baseball player
 June 2
 Carlos Acosta, Cuban-born ballet dancer
 Kevin Feige, American film producer and president of Marvel Studios
 June 8 – Lexa Doig, Canadian actress
 June 9 – Tedy Bruschi, American football player
 June 10 – Faith Evans, American singer
 June 14 – Ceca, Serbian folk singer
 June 15
 Neil Patrick Harris, American actor, comedian, singer, presenter and host
 Dean McAmmond, Canadian hockey player
 Greg Vaughan, American actor
 June 16 – Federica Mogherini, Italian politician
 June 17 
 Aurélie Filippetti, French politician and novelist
 Leander Paes, Indian tennis player
 June 19 – Yuko Nakazawa, Japanese singer
 June 20 – Josh Shapiro, American politician, Governor of Pennsylvania
 June 21
 Zuzana Čaputová, Slovak politician, President of Slovakia
 Juliette Lewis, American actress
 Fedja van Huêt, Dutch actor
 June 22 
 Carson Daly, American television personality, host of NBC's The Voice and Last Call with Carson Daly
 Giorgio Pasotti, Italian actor and martial arts athlete
 June 23 
 Davies Chisopa, Zambian politician
 Marija Naumova (Marie N), Latvian singer, Eurovision Song Contest 2002 winner
 June 24 – Jonathan Lambert, French actor and comedian
 June 25 – Jamie Redknapp, English footballer
 June 26 – Paweł Małaszyński, Polish actor
 June 27 
 Olve Eikemo, Norwegian musician
 Gonzalo López-Gallego, Spanish film director
 June 28 
 Adrián Annus, Hungarian athlete
 Frost, Norwegian musician
 Andre Lange, German Olympic bobsledder
 June 29 – Kento Masuda, Japanese composer and recording artist

July

 July 1 – Akhilesh Yadav, Indian politician
 July 3 – Patrick Wilson, American actor
 July 4 – Gackt, Japanese singer-songwriter and actor
 July 5
 Joe, American singer-songwriter and record producer
 Marcus Allbäck, Swedish footballer and coach
 July 7
 Troy Garity, American actor
 Yoon Kyung-shin, South Korean handball player
 July 8 
 Kathleen Robertson, Canadian actress and producer
 Medi Sadoun, French actor
 July 9 – Enrique Murciano, American actor
 July 11
 Andrew Bird, American violinist and singer-songwriter
 Konstantinos Kenteris, Greek athlete
 July 12 
 Inoke Afeaki, Tongan rugby union footballer
 Christian Vieri, Italian footballer
 July 13 
 Roberto Martínez, Spanish football manager 
 Danny Williams, British professional boxer
 July 14 
 Halil Mutlu, Bulgaria-born Turkish weightlifter
 Candela Peña, Spanish actress
 July 15
 John Dolmayan, Lebanese-born rock drummer for the band System of a Down
 Yasemin Şamdereli, Turkish-German actress, screenwriter, and film director
 July 16 
 Stefano Garzelli, Italian professional road racing cyclist
 Sandra Pires, Brazilian beach volleyball player
 July 17 – Daimaou Kosaka, Japanese comedian
 July 18 – Chi In-jin, South Korean boxer
 July 19
 Aílton, Brazilian football player
 Nathalie Boltt, South African actress
 Raja Krishnamoorthi, Indian born-American politician and lawyer
 Saïd Taghmaoui, French-American actor and screenwriter
 July 20
 Peter Forsberg, Swedish hockey player
 Haakon, Crown Prince of Norway
 July 22
 Rufus Wainwright, American-Canadian singer-songwriter and composer
 Jaime Camil, Mexican actor and singer
 Daniel Jones, Australian musician and record producer
 July 23
 Omar Epps, American actor
 Fran Healy, Scottish singer-songwriter 
 Monica Lewinsky, American White House intern
 July 25 – Dani Filth, British vocalist
 July 26 – Kate Beckinsale, English actress
 July 30
 Markus Näslund, Swedish ice hockey player
 Sonu Nigam, Indian singer
 July 31 – Jacob Aagaard, Danish-Scottish chess player

August

 August 1 – Edurne Pasaban, Basque Spanish mountaineer
 August 2
 Miguel Mendonca, Anglo-Azorean writer
 Susie O'Neill, Australian swimmer
 August 3 – Stephen Graham, English actor
 August 4 – Marcos, Brazilian footballer
 August 6
 Asia Carrera, American actress
 Vera Farmiga, American actress, director and producer
 August 9 
 Kevin McKidd, Scottish actor
 Filippo Inzaghi, Italian footballer
 Oleksandr Ponomariov, Ukrainian singer
 August 10 
 Lisa Raymond, American tennis player
 Javier Zanetti, Argentine football player
 August 11 – Carolyn Murphy, American model
 August 14
 Jared Borgetti, Mexican footballer
 Jay-Jay Okocha, Nigerian footballer
 Kieren Perkins, Australian swimmer
 August 19
 Marco Materazzi, Italian football player
 HRH Crown Princess Mette-Marit of Norway
 August 21
 Sergey Brin, Russian-born American entrepreneur, co-founder of Google
 Steve McKenna, Canadian ice hockey player
 Nikolai Valuev, Russian heavyweight boxing champion
 August 22
 Howie D., American singer (Backstreet Boys)
 Kristen Wiig, American actress, comedian, and writer
 August 23 – Joey Cramer, Canadian child actor
 August 24
 Dave Chappelle, African-American actor and comedian
 Inge de Bruijn, Dutch swimmer
 Grey DeLisle, American voice actress, comedian, and singer-songwriter
 August 28 – Kirby Morrow, Canadian actor, comedian, and writer (d. 2020)
 August 31 – Scott Niedermayer, Canadian Ice Hockey player

September 

 September 1 – Ram Kapoor, Indian actor
 September 4 – Diosbelys Hurtado, Cuban boxer
 September 5
 Paddy Considine, British actor, filmmaker, and musician
 Rose McGowan, American actress
 Rachel Sheherazade, Brazilian journalist
 September 6
 Carlo Cudicini, Italian footballer
 Greg Rusedski, Canadian-British tennis player
 September 7 – Shannon Elizabeth, American actress
 September 11 - Sohrab Bakhtiarizadeh, Iranian footballer
 September 12
 Tarana Burke, American civil rights activist 
 Darren Campbell, British athlete
 Paul Walker, American actor (d. 2013)
 September 13 – Fabio Cannavaro, Italian footballer
 September 14
 Andrew Lincoln, English actor
 Nas, African-American rapper
 September 15 – Prince Daniel, Duke of Västergötland, né Olof Daniel Westling, Swedish prince, married to Crown Princess Victoria
 September 17 – Ada Choi, Hong Kong actress
 September 18
 James Marsden, American actor
 Ami Onuki, Japanese singer
 Mark Shuttleworth, South African entrepreneur
 September 19
 José Azevedo, Portuguese cyclist
 David Zepeda, Mexican actor, model, and singer
 September 20 – Jo Pavey, British athlete
 September 21 
 Virginia Ruano Pascual, Spanish tennis player
 Oswaldo Sánchez, Mexican footballer
 September 25 – Bridgette Wilson-Sampras, American actress
 September 29
 Alfie Boe, English tenor
 Joe Hulbig, American ice hockey player
 September 30 – David Ury, American actor

October

 October 2 
 Lene Nystrøm, Norwegian singer (Aqua)
 Proof, American rapper (D12) (d. 2006)
 Verka Serduchka, Ukrainian Drag queen, comedian and singer, Eurovision Song Contest 2007 runner-up
 October 3 – Neve Campbell, Canadian actress
 October 4 – Chris Parks, American professional wrestler
 October 6 
 Ioan Gruffudd, Welsh actor
 Rebecca Lobo, American basketball player
 October 7 
 Dida, Brazilian footballer
 Sami Hyypiä, Finnish football player and coach
 October 8 – Kari Korhonen, Finnish cartoonist
 October 10 – Mario Lopez, American actor
 October 11 – Daisuke Sakaguchi, Japanese voice actor
 October 13
 Matt Hughes, American mixed martial arts fighter
 Nanako Matsushima, Japanese actress
 October 14 
 George Floyd, African-American victim of police brutality (d. 2020)
 Lasha Zhvania, Georgian politician
 October 15 – Susy Pryde, New Zealand cyclist
 October 16 – Todd van der Heyden, Canadian journalist and news anchor
 October 17 – Deniz Uğur, Turkish actress
 October 18 – Sergey Bezrukov, Russian screen and stage actor
 October 22 – Andrés Palop, Spanish football player and coach
 October 26 – Seth MacFarlane, American actor, screenwriter, producer, director, and singer
 October 28 
 Maryam Nawaz, Pakistani politician
 Montel Vontavious Porter, American professional wrestler
 October 29 – Robert Pires, French football player
 October 30
 Silvia Corzo, Colombian newsreader
 Edge, Canadian professional wrestler

November

 November 1
 Assia, Algerian singer
 Li Xiaoshuang, Chinese gymnast 
 Aishwarya Rai, Indian actress, Miss World 1994
 November 2 – Marisol Nichols, American actress
 November 3
 Kirk Jones, African-American rapper (Onyx)
 Mick Thomson, American guitarist
 November 4 – Steven Ogg, Canadian actor
 November 7 
 Yunjin Kim, South Korean-American film and theater actress
 Martín Palermo, Argentine footballer
 November 9
 Alyson Court, Canadian actress and voice actress
 Nick Lachey, American actor, singer and television personality and host
 November 10 – Patrik Berger, Czech footballer
 November 17 – Alexei Urmanov, Russian figure skater
 November 22 – Cassie Campbell, Canadian ice hockey forward and CBC commentator
 November 26 – Peter Facinelli, American actor
 November 27 – Sharlto Copley, South African producer, actor, and director
 November 29 – Ryan Giggs, Welsh footballer
 November 30
 Nimród Antal, Hungarian-American film director, screenwriter, and actor
 Christian, Canadian professional wrestler
 Im Chang-jung, South Korean actor

December

 December 2
 Monica Seles, Hungarian-Yugoslavian tennis player
 Jan Ullrich, German professional road bicycle racer
Grant Wahl, American sports journalist (d. 2022)
 December 3 
 Holly Marie Combs, American actress
 Francisco Islas Rueda, Mexican professional wrestler
 December 4 – Tyra Banks, American supermodel, talk show host
 December 5
 Arik Benado, Israeli footballer
 Sorin Grindeanu, 65th Prime Minister of Romania
 December 7
 Terrell Owens, American football player
 Damien Rice, Irish singer-songwriter, musician, and record producer
 December 8 – Corey Taylor, American rock vocalist (Slipknot, Stone Sour)
 December 9 – Bárbara Padilla, American operatic soprano
 December 10 
Arden Myrin, American comedian
Gabriela Spanic, Venezuelan-Mexican actress
 December 11 – Mos Def, African-American rapper and actor
 December 12 – Paz Lenchantin, Argentine-American musician
 December 14
 Tom S. Englund, Swedish musician
 Tomasz Radzinski, Canadian footballer
 Thuy Trang, Vietnamese-born actress (d. 2001)
 December 15 – Surya Bonaly, French figure skater
 December 17 – Paula Radcliffe, British athlete
 December 18 – Darryl Brown, Trinidad and West Indian cricketer
 December 20 – Antti Kasvio, Finnish swimmer 
 December 27 – Wilson Cruz, American actor
 December 28
 Seth Meyers, American actor and comedian, host of Late Night with Seth Meyers Ids Postma, Dutch speed skater
 December 30 – Ato Boldon, Trinidadian athlete
 December 31 – Nikolay Tsiskaridze, Russian dancer

Deaths

January

 January 2 – Eleazar López Contreras, 45th President of Venezuela (b. 1883)
 January 22 – Lyndon B. Johnson, 36th President of the United States (b. 1908)
 January 23 – Kid Ory, American musician (b. 1886)
 January 24 – J. Carrol Naish, American actor (b. 1896)
 January 26 – Edward G. Robinson, American actor (b. 1893)
 January 28 – John Banner, Austrian-born actor (b. 1910)
 January 31  
 Ragnar Frisch, Norwegian economist, Nobel Prize laureate (b. 1895)
 Jack MacGowran, Irish film actor (b. 1918)

February

 February 11 – J. Hans D. Jensen, German physicist, Nobel Prize laureate (b. 1907)
 February 15 – Wally Cox, American actor (b. 1924)
 February 16 – Francisco Caamaño, 50th President of the Dominican Republic (executed) (b. 1932)
 February 18 – Frank Costello, Italian-American Mafia gangster and crime boss (b. 1891)
 February 19 
 Ivan T. Sanderson, Scottish-American naturalist, cryptozoologist and writer (b. 1911)
 Joseph Szigeti, Hungarian violinist (b. 1892)
 February 22
 Elizabeth Bowen, Irish novelist (b. 1899)
 Katina Paxinou, Greek actress (b. 1900)
 February 23 – Dickinson W. Richards, American physician, recipient of the Nobel Prize in Physiology or Medicine (b. 1895)
 February 28 – Cecil Kellaway, South African actor (b. 1890)

March

 March 3 – Vera Panova, Soviet-Russian writer (b. 1905)
 March 6 – Pearl S. Buck, American writer, Nobel Prize laureate (b. 1892)
 March 8 – Benjamín de Arriba y Castro, Spanish Roman Catholic archbishop and cardinal (b. 1886)
 March 10 – Robert Siodmak, German-born American director (b. 1900)
 March 13 – Melville Cooper, British actor (b. 1896)
 March 17 – Giuseppe Ferretto, Italian Roman Catholic cardinal (b. 1899)
 March 18
 Johannes Aavik, Estonian philologist (b. 1880)
 Lauritz Melchior, Danish opera singer (b. 1890)
 March 22 – Hilda Geiringer, Austrian mathematician (b. 1893)
 March 25 – Edward Steichen, Luxembourg-born American photographer (b. 1879)
 March 26 – Sir Noël Coward, English composer and playwright (b. 1899)

April

 April 8 – Pablo Picasso, Spanish artist (b. 1881)
 April 12 – Arthur Freed, American film producer (b. 1894)
 April 13 – Dudley Senanayake, 2nd Prime Minister of Sri Lanka (b. 1911)
 April 14 – Károly Kerényi, Hungarian philologist and mythologist (b. 1897)
 April 16
 Nino Bravo, Spanish singer (b. 1944)
 Istvan Kertesz, Hungarian conductor (b. 1929)
 April 19 – Hans Kelsen, Austrian-born legal theorist (b. 1881)
 April 21
 Merian C. Cooper, American aviator, director, and producer (b. 1893)
 Sir Arthur Fadden, Australian politician, 13th Prime Minister of Australia (b. 1894)
 April 25
 Fuad Chehab, 8th President of Lebanon (b. 1902)
 Frank Jack Fletcher, American admiral (b. 1885)
 April 26 – Irene Ryan, American actress (b. 1902)
 April 28 – Jacques Maritain, French Catholic philosopher (b. 1882)

May

 May 1 – Asger Jorn, Danish painter (b. 1914)
 May 6 – Myrna Fahey, American actress (b. 1933)
 May 8 – Alexander Vandegrift, American general (b. 1887)
 May 11 – Lex Barker, American actor (b. 1919)
 May 12 – Frances Marion, American screenwriter (b. 1888).
 May 16 – Jacques Lipchitz, French-American sculptor (b. 1891)
 May 18 – Jeannette Rankin, American politician (b. 1880)
 May 20 – Jarno Saarinen, Finnish motorcycle racer (b. 1945)
 May 21 
 Ivan Konev, Marshal of the Soviet Union (b. 1897)
 Vaughn Monroe, American singer (b. 1911)
 May 26
 Karl Löwith, German philosopher (b. 1897)
 May 27 – Constantin Daicoviciu, Romanian historian and archaeologist (b. 1898)

June

 June 8 – Emmy Göring nee'' Sonnemann, German actress, second wife of Hermann Göring (b. 1893)
 June 9 – Erich von Manstein, German field marshal (b. 1887)
 June 10 – William Inge, American playwright (b. 1913)
 June 30
 Nancy Mitford, English novelist (b. 1904)
 Vasyl Velychkovsky C.Ss.R, Ukrainian Catholic bishop and martyr; beatified on 27 June 2001 (b. 1903)

July

 July 2 – Betty Grable, American actress (b. 1916)
 July 6
 Joe E. Brown, American actor and comedian (b. 1891)
 Otto Klemperer, German conductor (b. 1885)
 July 7
 Max Horkheimer, German philosopher and sociologist (b. 1895)
 Veronica Lake, American actress (b. 1922)
 July 8
 Ben-Zion Dinur, Russian-born Israeli educator, historian and politician (b. 1884)
 Wilfred Rhodes, English cricketer (b. 1877)
 July 11
 Alexander Mosolov, Russian composer (b. 1900)
 Robert Ryan, American actor (b. 1909)
 July 12 – Lon Chaney Jr., American actor (b. 1906)
 July 13 – Willy Fritsch, German actor (b. 1901)
 July 18 – Jack Hawkins, British actor (b. 1910)
 July 20
 Mikhail Isakovsky, Russian poet (b. 1900)
 Bruce Lee, Chinese-American martial artist and actor (b. 1940)
 Robert Smithson, American artist (b. 1938)
 July 23 – Eddie Rickenbacker, American World War I flying ace and race car driver (b. 1890)
 July 24 – Julián Acuña Galé, Cuban botanist (b. 1900)
 July 25 
 Dezső Pattantyús-Ábrahám, Prime Minister of Hungary (b. 1875)
 Louis St. Laurent, 12th Prime Minister of Canada (b. 1882)
 July 26 – Konstantinos Georgakopoulos, Greek lawyer and professor, 152nd Prime Minister of Greece (b. 1890)
 July 29
 Henri Charrière, French writer (b. 1906)
 Julio Adalberto Rivera Carballo, 34th President of El Salvador (b. 1921)
 Roger Williamson, British racing driver (b. 1948)
 July 31 – Annibale Bergonzoli, Italian general (b. 1884)

August

 August 1
 Gian Francesco Malipiero, Italian composer (b. 1882)
 Walter Ulbricht, East German politician, former leader of the Communist Party and 2nd head of State of the GDR (b. 1893)
 Nikos Zachariadis, Greek politician, former leader of the Communist Party of Greece (b. 1903)
 August 2 – Jean-Pierre Melville, French film director (b. 1917)
 August 4 – Eddie Condon, American jazz musician (b. 1905)
 August 6
 Fulgencio Batista, 9th and 12th President of Cuba (b. 1901)
 James Beck, British actor (b. 1929)
 August 9 – Charles Daniels, American Olympic swimmer (b. 1885)
 August 10 – Douglas Kennedy, American actor (b. 1915)
 August 11 – Peggie Castle, American actress (b. 1927)
 August 12
 Walter Rudolf Hess, Swiss physiologist, Nobel Prize laureate (b. 1881)
 Karl Ziegler, German chemist, Nobel Prize laureate (b. 1898)
 August 16
 Veda Ann Borg, American actress (b. 1915)
 Selman Waksman, Ukrainian-American biochemist, recipient of the Nobel Prize in Physiology or Medicine (b. 1888)
 August 17
 Conrad Aiken, American writer (b. 1889)
 Jean Barraqué, French composer (b. 1928)
 Paul Williams, American singer (The Temptations) (b. 1939)
 August 18 
 François Bonlieu, French Olympic alpine skier (b. 1937)
 Basil Brooke, 1st Viscount Brookeborough, British politician, 3rd Prime Minister of Northern Ireland (b. 1888)
 August 30 – Michael Dunn, American actor (b. 1934)
 August 31 – John Ford, American film director (b. 1894)

September

 September 2 – J. R. R. Tolkien, British writer (b. 1892)
 September 11 – Salvador Allende, 30th President of Chile (b. 1908)
 September 12 – Marjorie Merriweather Post, American businesswoman (b. 1887)
 September 13 – Betty Field, American actress (b. 1913)
 September 15 – King Gustaf VI Adolf of Sweden (b. 1882)
 September 16 
 Rafael Franco, 33rd President of Paraguay (b. 1896)
 Víctor Jara, Chilean political activist and singer-songwriter (b. 1932)
 September 18 – Théo Lefèvre, 39th Prime Minister of Belgium (b. 1914)
 September 19 – Gram Parsons, American musician (b. 1946)
 September 20 – Jim Croce, American songwriter (b. 1943)
 September 22 – Paul van Zeeland, 29th Prime Minister of Belgium (b. 1893)
 September 23 – Pablo Neruda, Chilean poet, Nobel Prize laureate (b. 1904)
 September 24 – Josué de Castro, Brazilian writer, physician, geographer, and activist against hunger (b. 1908)
 September 26 – Anna Magnani, Italian actress (b. 1908)
 September 28 
 Norma Crane, American actress (b. 1928)
 Mantan Moreland, American actor and comedian (b. 1902)
 September 29 – W. H. Auden, English poet (b. 1907)

October

 October 1 – Mohammad Hashim Maiwandwal, former Prime Minister of Afghanistan (b. 1921)
 October 2
 Paul Hartman, American dancer and actor (b. 1904)
 Paavo Nurmi, Finnish Olympic athlete (b. 1897)
 October 6 – François Cevert, French racing driver (b. 1944)
 October 8 – Gabriel Marcel, French Catholic existential thinker (b. 1889)
 October 9 – Sister Rosetta Tharpe, American singer and guitarist (b. 1915)
 October 10 – Ludwig von Mises, Austrian economist (b. 1881)
 October 16 – Gene Krupa, American jazz drummer (b. 1909)
 October 17 – Ingeborg Bachmann, Austrian poet and author (b. 1926)
 October 18
 Leo Strauss, German-American political philosopher (b. 1899)
 Walt Kelly, American cartoonist (b. 1913)
 Crane Wilbur, American actor (b. 1886)
 October 19 – Margaret C. Anderson, American magazine publisher (b. 1886)
 October 22 – Pablo Casals, Spanish cellist and conductor (b. 1876)
 October 25 – Abebe Bikila, Ethiopian Olympic athlete (b. 1932)
 October 26 – Semyon Budyonny, Cossack cavalryman and Marshal of the Soviet Union (b. 1883)
 October 27 – Allan Lane, American actor (b. 1909)
 October 28 
 Cleo Moore, American actress (b. 1928)
 Taha Hussein, Egyptian writer (b. 1889)

November

 November 3 
 Arturo de Córdova, Mexican actor (b. 1908)
 Marc Allégret, French film director (b. 1900)
 November 7 – Kiyohide Shima, Japanese admiral (b. 1890)
 November 10 – Morton Deyo, American admiral (b. 1887)
 November 11
 Hassan al-Hudaybi, Egyptian general (b. 1891)
 Artturi Ilmari Virtanen, Finnish chemist, Nobel Prize laureate (b. 1895)
 November 12 – Wacław Stachiewicz, Polish writer, geologist, and general (b. 1894)
 November 13 
 B. S. Johnson, English experimental novelist (b. 1933)
 Lila Lee, American actress (b. 1905)
 Bruno Maderna, Italian conductor and composer (b. 1920)
 Elsa Schiaparelli, Italian fashion designer (b. 1890)
 November 16 – Alan Watts, British philosopher (b. 1915)
 November 17  – Mirra Alfassa, multi-origined spiritual leader and founder of Auroville, India (b. 1878)
 November 18 – Alois Hába, Czech composer and musicologist (b. 1893)
 November 20 – Allan Sherman, American comedy writer, television producer, and song parodist (b. 1924)
 November 23
 Sessue Hayakawa, Japanese-born American actor and film director (b. 1886)
 Constance Talmadge, American actress (b. 1898)
 November 25
 Albert DeSalvo, American criminal, suspect in the Boston Strangler case (b. 1931)
 Laurence Harvey, English actor (b. 1928)
 November 28 – John Rostill, English bassist, musician and composer (The Shadows) (b. 1942)

December

 December 1 – David Ben-Gurion, 1st Prime Minister of Israel (b. 1886)
 December 3 – Adolfo Ruiz Cortines, 47th President of Mexico (b. 1889)
 December 4 – Lauri Lehtinen, Finnish Olympic athlete (b. 1908)
 December 5 – Sir Robert Watson-Watt, Scottish engineer, radar pioneer (b. 1892)
 December 12 
 Atilio García, Argentine-born Uruguayan football player (b. 1914)
 Naokuni Nomura, Japanese admiral and Minister of the Navy (b. 1885)
 December 13 – Giuseppe Beltrami, Italian Roman Catholic cardinal (b. 1889)
 December 16 – Sid Barnes, Australian cricketer (b. 1916)
 December 17 – Charles Greeley Abbot, American astrophysicist (d. 1872)
 December 20
 Luis Carrero Blanco, Spanish admiral and politician, 69th Prime Minister of Spain (b. 1904)
 Bobby Darin, American singer, songwriter, musician, actor, dancer, impressionist, and TV presenter (b. 1936)
 December 22 – James Anderson, Australian tennis champion (b. 1894)
 December 23 – Gerard Kuiper, Dutch-born American astronomer (b. 1905)
 December 25
 İsmet İnönü, Turkish general and statesman, 3-time Prime Minister of Turkey and 2nd President of Turkey during World War II (b. 1884)
 Gabriel Voisin, French aviation pioneer (b. 1880)
 December 26 – Harold B. Lee, American president of the Church of Jesus Christ of Latter-day Saints (b. 1899)

Nobel Prizes

 Physics – Leo Esaki, Ivar Giaever, Brian David Josephson
 Chemistry – Ernst Otto Fischer, Geoffrey Wilkinson
 Medicine – Karl von Frisch, Konrad Lorenz, Nikolaas Tinbergen
 Literature – Patrick White
 Peace – Henry Kissinger, Lê Đức Thọ
 Economics – Wassily Leontief

References